"...To Be Loved" is the first single from the band Papa Roach's fourth album, The Paramour Sessions, and eighth released single in total. The song is a slight return to the band early work, starting with a rapping introduction, but as the introduction goes the rapping then goes into fast screaming making it different from the usual rapping of the band's early releases. Most of the song is singing with Jacoby singing in the verses and also choruses. The song follows the band's hard rock sound of their previous album. The song hit American radio stations on August 7, 2006. The song was played in full on Kerrang! Radio in the United Kingdom on August 1, 2006 and has since become available to download via the iTunes Store and Walmart Downloads store as a radio edit version. On September 18, the single became available in UK stores as a 7" vinyl picture disc with a complimentary Papa Roach sticker. The CD was released on October 11, 2006. The song was used as the official theme song for WWE Raw on the USA Network from October 9, 2006 to November 9, 2009. The song has risen to number eight on the Mainstream Rock Tracks and number 14 on the Modern Rock Tracks and played during the theatrical trailer of the 2008 film Never Back Down.

Music video 
The music video was shot at Park Plaza Hotel (Los Angeles) and was directed by Kevin Kerslake. It begins by showing two skimpy-dressed women who are picked up by the vocalist, Jacoby Shaddix, of the band with three other women in the back. Then they arrive at a building where the band is playing. Meanwhile, strippers and circus performers are seen in the background, along with a huge crowd of fans. The video was shot on August 3, 2006. On August 15, 2006, the video for "...To Be Loved" premiered on Yahoo Music. There are three versions. The original censored one, one for public viewings (which removes the scene where a girl is shown on a leash), and an uncensored version. The start of the song also samples the Ramones' "Blitzkrieg Bop", with the 'Hey Ho, Lets Go!'.

Appearances 
The music video had various actors, adult stars, and musicians in this video. Jason Jenson, lead singer of the band formerly known as Die Trying. Telly "Leatherface" Blackwood known actor, producer, wrestler from MTV's Viva La Bam.

Track listing

7" single

Chart performance

References

Papa Roach songs
2006 singles
WWE Raw
2006 songs
Song recordings produced by Howard Benson
Geffen Records singles
Songs written by Jacoby Shaddix
Songs written by Tobin Esperance